"Hold Me 'Til the Morning Comes" is a 1983 song by Paul Anka, featuring backing vocals by former Chicago singer Peter Cetera. It was co-written by Anka with David Foster. It was the first release and only hit from his LP, Walk a Fine Line. "Hold Me 'Til the Morning Comes" was included on Anka's collaborative LP, A Body of Work.

Background
The song describes a man who is in a relationship that's dying, yet both are afraid to walk away from it.  He struggles with ambivalent feelings, however, still longs to hold on to the love they have shared.

Chart performance
The song scratched the top 40 of the Billboard Hot 100, peaking at only number 40. It spent four months on the chart, longer than almost all of Anka's other hits, including some of his highest-charting songs. This was his last (and final top 40 hit) of 53 charting pop singles in the US to date. The song also spent three weeks at number two on the US Adult Contemporary chart.  It was blocked from the number-one spot first by DeBarge's "All This Love" and then by Rita Coolidge's "All Time High".

In Canada, the song failed to enter the pop singles chart, however, it reached number one on the Adult Contemporary chart in August 1983.

Weekly charts

Use in media
 The song appeared in the 2016 Disney animated feature Zootopia.

References

External links
 Song Facts
 

1983 songs
1983 singles
1980s ballads
Songs written by Paul Anka
Songs written by David Foster
Columbia Records singles
Male vocal duets
Paul Anka songs
Peter Cetera songs
Canadian soft rock songs